The Billabong Pro Teahupoo 2017 was an event of the Association of Surfing Professionals for 2017 World Surf League.

This event was held from 11 to 22  August at Teahupo'o, (Tahiti, French Polynesia) and opposed by 36 surfers. The winner of the competition was Julian Wilson, who defeated Gabriel Medina in the final.

Round 1

Round 2

Round 3

Round 4

Round 5

Quarter finals

Semi finals

Final

References

Tahiti Pro
2017 World Surf League